Corynosoma is a genus of parasitic worms belonging to the family Polymorphidae.

The genus has almost cosmopolitan distribution.

Species:

Corynosoma alaskensis 
Corynosoma australe 
Corynosoma beaglense 
Corynosoma bullosum 
Corynosoma cameroni 
Corynosoma caspicum 
Corynosoma cetaceum 
Corynosoma curilense 
Corynosoma enhydri 
Corynosoma erignathi 
Corynosoma evae 
Corynosoma falcatum 
Corynosoma gibsoni 
Corynosoma hamanni 
Corynosoma hannae 
Corynosoma magdaleni 
Corynosoma pseudohamanni 
Corynosoma rauschi 
Corynosoma reductum 
Corynosoma semerme 
Corynosoma septentrionale 
Corynosoma shackletoni 
Corynosoma simile 
Corynosoma stanleyi 
Corynosoma strumosum 
Corynosoma validum 
Corynosoma ventronudum 
Corynosoma villosum 
Corynosoma wegeneri

References

Polymorphidae
Acanthocephala genera